Walt Southgate Brewster (August 16, 1907 – January 30, 1985) was a professional American football player with the National Football League's Buffalo Bisons in 1929. Brewster was the starting right offensive tackle in seven games of the eight game season, listed as 6'1 195 lbs. He went to West Virginia University, and was born in 1907 (sources vary as to date) in Plymouth, Massachusetts, United States. He died in New Orleans, Louisiana.

References

Walt Brewster stats, Pro-Football-Reference.com
Walt Brewster stats, databaseFootball.com
Walt Brewster's profile at NFL.com

American football offensive tackles
West Virginia Mountaineers football players
1907 births
1985 deaths
People from Lewisburg, West Virginia
Players of American football from West Virginia
Buffalo Bisons (NFL) players